Transmembrane protease, serine 11B is a protein that in humans is encoded by the TMPRSS11B gene.

References

Further reading